Jean-Joseph Weerts (1 May 1846, Roubaix - 28 September 1927, Paris) was a French painter of Belgian origin who worked in the Academic style.

Biography
His father was a mechanical engineer who gave him his first introduction to drawing. Later, in 1858, he attended the Académie des Beaux-arts de Roubaix. With a pension (stipend) from Roubaix, he enrolled at the École des Beaux-arts in 1867, working in the studios of Alexandre Cabanel.

He produced nearly 700 works, including portraits and paintings on historical and religious themes. The Death of Bara earned him the Légion d'honneur in 1884. He also decorated a number of public buildings throughout France and participated in several official projects for the Third Republic, including the Hôtel de Ville, the Sorbonne and the Hôtel des Monnaies. He also worked at the Limoges City Hall and the College of Medicine in Lyon.

He was buried at Père-Lachaise, and a street in Roubaix was named after him. A monument in his honor was created by the sculptor Alexandre Descatoire and may be seen in Roubaix's Parc Barbieux.

See also
Pour l'Humanité, pour la Patrie

References

Further reading
 Didier Schulmann, Jean-Joseph Weerts, exhibition catalog, Musée de Roubaix, 1989 
 Amandine Delcourt and Chantal Acheré, Les Jean-Joseph Weerts de la Piscine, exhibition catalog, La Piscine, Roubaix, 2012

External links 

 ArtNet: More works by Weerts
 "La Piscine exhibits its Weerts" by Didier Rykner from the Art Tribune 
Fresco in the Grand Amphitheater at the University of Lyon 2, 15 meters long, 7 meters high.  
France! or the Despair of Alsace and Lorraine, Musée Lorrain in Nancy 

1846 births
1927 deaths
History painters
Portrait painters
19th-century French painters
French male painters
20th-century French painters
20th-century French male artists
19th-century French male artists